Rangsit Yanothai (born 27 October 1936) is a Thai former sports shooter. He competed at the 1968, 1972 and 1984 Summer Olympics. He also won several medals at the Asian Games.

References

1936 births
Living people
Rangsit Yanothai
Rangsit Yanothai
Shooters at the 1968 Summer Olympics
Shooters at the 1972 Summer Olympics
Shooters at the 1984 Summer Olympics
Place of birth missing (living people)
Asian Games medalists in shooting
Shooters at the 1966 Asian Games
Shooters at the 1970 Asian Games
Shooters at the 1978 Asian Games
Rangsit Yanothai
Rangsit Yanothai
Rangsit Yanothai
Medalists at the 1966 Asian Games
Medalists at the 1970 Asian Games
Medalists at the 1978 Asian Games
Rangsit Yanothai